Ngor Okpala is a Local Government Area of Imo State, Nigeria. Its headquarters is in the town of Umuneke Ngor.
 
It has an area of 561 km²; it has a population of 159,932 at the 2006 census. It is a notable place in Imo state because of the LGA's locational position. It connects Abia and Rivers states of Nigeria. It is the largest local government area in Imo State and one of the largest in Nigeria.

The postal code of the area is 460. 
There are many Communities in Ngor Okpala
They include: Umuowa, Obiangwu, Ntu, Alulu, Amala, Oburu, Obokwe, Eziama, Ohekelem, Nnorie, Umuhu, Ihite-Okwe, Obike, Elelem, Umuohiagu, Imerienwe, Nguru-Umuaro, Orishieze, Upe, Umuekwune, Logara, Umukabia-Ogodo and many others.

Imo Airport officially called Sam Mbakwe International Cargo Airport is situated in
Ngor-Okpala with its busiest junction at Umuowa along Owerri-Aba road.

Ngor Okpala is one of the fastest developing local governments in Imo State. The LGA is blessed with natural and mineral resources which have not been fully tapped.

In Ngor Okpala is a popular town named Okpala. Okpala is one of the villages in Ama-Asaa, due to the popularity of the name it takes over the name 'Ama-Asaa', 'Okpala Junction'. Okpala the central of the seven villages has four kindred which include Amankwu, Amaube, Umuokereke, and Umuodah.

Notable people
 

Henry Okoroji (born 1984), footballer

References

Local Government Areas in Imo State
Local Government Areas in Igboland